John Hyde Sweet (usually referred to as J. Hyde Sweet) (September 1, 1880 – April 4, 1964) was an American newspaper publisher Republican Party politician. He was most notable for his brief service as a member of the United States House of Representatives from Nebraska.

Sweet was born in Milford, New York on September 1, 1880, and moved to Palmyra, Nebraska in 1885. He attended the University of Nebraska-Lincoln and Lincoln Business College in Lincoln, Nebraska.

After graduating, he worked as court reporter in western Nebraska from 1899 to 1900, and then as a grocer in Nebraska City from 1902 to 1909. After that he served as manager and then editor of the Nebraska City News newspaper and was a Nebraskan delegate to the 1912 Progressive National Convention.

In 1940 was elected as a Republican to the Seventy-sixth United States Congress to fill the vacancy left by the previous representative George H. Heinke, who had died in a car crash in the January of that year. Sweet served for less than a year, and did not run in the following election.

He died April 4, 1964, in Wickenburg, Arizona and was buried at Wyuka Cemetery, Nebraska City, Nebraska.

References

External links
  papers at the Nebraska State Historical Society. Retrieved on Nov. 16, 2009.

1880 births
1964 deaths
University of Nebraska–Lincoln alumni
People from Milford, New York
People from Otoe County, Nebraska
Republican Party members of the United States House of Representatives from Nebraska
People from Wickenburg, Arizona
20th-century American politicians